The football tournament at the 1980 Summer Olympics started on 20 July and ended on 2 August. Only one event, the men's tournament, was contested. Seven qualified countries did not participate joining the American-led boycott in protest of the Soviet invasion of Afghanistan.

Sixteen teams were divided into four groups:
Group A (USSR, Cuba, Venezuela, Zambia)
Group B (Colombia, Kuwait, Nigeria, Czechoslovakia)
Group C (Algeria, Spain, GDR, Syria)
Group D (Costa Rica, Finland, Iraq, Yugoslavia)

In the technical report following the competition, FIFA reported that: "Compared with the 1979 World Youth Tournament in Japan and the 1978 World Cup finals in Argentina, the standard of football at the Olympic Football Tournament was generally of an inferior quality,".

Venues

The football tournament was the most attended event on these Olympics: 1,821,624 spectators watched 32 matches of it at the stadiums.

Qualification

Due to the American-led boycott, countries (in brackets) who qualified did not enter the final
tournament. Spain sent a team under the IOC flag. The following 16 teams qualified for the 1980 Olympics football tournament:

Africa (CAF)

 (replaces )
 (replaces )
Asia (AFC)
 (replaces )

 (replaces )
North and Central America (CONCACAF)

 (replaces )

South America (CONMEBOL)

 (replaces )
Europe (UEFA)

 (replaces )
 

Hosting nation

Match officials

Africa
  Belaïd Lacarne
  Bassey Eyo-Honesty
  Nyrenda Chayu

Asia
  Salim Naji Al-Hachami
  Ali Abdulwahab Al Bannai
  Marwan Arafat

North and Central America
  Luis Paulino Siles
  Ramón Calderón Castro
  Mario Rubio Vázquez

South America
  Romualdo Arppi Filho
  Guillermo Velásquez
  Enrique Labo Revoredo
  José Castro Lozada

Europe
  Franz Wöhrer
  Vojtěch Christov
  Anders Mattsson
  Riccardo Lattanzi
  Klaus Scheurell
  Bob Valentine
  Emilio Guruceta-Muro
  Ulf Eriksson
  André Daina
  Marjan Raus
  Eldar Azimzade

Squads

Final tournament

First round

Group A

Group B

Group C

Group D

Bracket

Quarter-finals

Semi-finals

Bronze Medal match

Gold Medal match

The final was played in a hard rain for the third straight Olympics. Both teams played with ten players after the 58th minute after one player from each team was red-carded.

Medalists

Goalscorers

With five goals, Sergey Andreyev of Soviet Union was the top scorer of the tournament. In total, 82 goals were scored by 52 different players, with only one of them credited as own goal.

5 goals
 Sergey Andreyev

4 goals

 Ladislav Vízek
 Wolf-Rüdiger Netz
 Fyodor Cherenkov

3 goals

 Frank Terletzki
 Faisal Al-Dakhil
 Yuri Gavrilov

2 goals

 Lakhdar Belloumi
 Lubomír Pokluda
 Falah Hassan
 Jasem Yaqoub
 Vagiz Khidiyatullin
 Khoren Hovhannisyan
 Iker Zubizarreta
 Miloš Šestić
 Zlatko Vujović
 Zoran Vujović
 Godfrey Chitalu

1 goal

 Rabah Madjer
 Chaabane Merzekane
 Benjamin Cardona
 Carlos Molinares
 Omar Arroyo
 Jorge White
 Luis Hernández
 Ramón Núñez
 Andrés Roldán
 Jan Berger
 Werner Lička
 Zdeněk Šreiner
 Jindřich Svoboda
 Jouko Alila
 Jouko Soini
 Ari Tissari
 Lothar Hause
 Dieter Kühn
 Werner Peter
 Rüdiger Schnuphase
 Wolfgang Steinbach
 Hadi Ahmed
 Hussein Saeed
 Henry Nwosu
 Marcos Alonso Peña
 Hipólito Rincón
 Oleg Romantsev
 Sergey Shavlo
 Volodymyr Bessonov
 Robert Elie
 Dževad Šećerbegović
 Boro Primorac
 Ante Miročević

Own goals
 Mahboub Mubarak (playing against Nigeria)

Final ranking
Below the final ranking after the end of the tournament.

References

External links

Olympic Football Tournament Moscow 1980, FIFA.com
RSSSF Summary
FIFA Technical Report

 
1980 Summer Olympics events
1980

Olympics
1980
1980
1980
1980
1980 in Soviet football